The Zhiluo Formation is a geological formation in China, it is also alternatively considered a geological group under the name Zhiluo Group (formerly known as the Chiloo Group). It dates to the Middle Jurassic. It consists of sandstone, mudstone and siltstone of varying colours. It has received scientific attention for its uranium ore bodies present in the lower part of the formation. Fossil theropod tracks have been reported from the formation. These were described from two footprints found in Jiaoping Coal Mine by C. C. Young in 1966 as Shensipus tungchuanensis. These were in 2015 suggested to belong to Anomoepus. The dinosaur Lingwulong has been suggested to have come from the strata of this formation, previously having been attributed to the underlying Yanan Formation.

See also

 List of dinosaur-bearing rock formations
 List of stratigraphic units with theropod tracks

Footnotes

References
 Weishampel, David B.; Dodson, Peter; and Osmólska, Halszka (eds.): The Dinosauria, 2nd, Berkeley: University of California Press. 861 pp. .

Geologic groups of Asia
Geologic formations of China

Jurassic System of Asia